The Electoral district of Mindarie was a Legislative Assembly electorate in the state of Western Australia. The district was named for the outer northern Perth suburb of Mindarie, which falls within its borders.

History

Mindarie was created at the 2003 redistribution out of parts of Wanneroo and Joondalup, accounting for significant population growth in the City of Wanneroo which had pulled the Wanneroo district northwards and eastwards in order to keep all seats at a roughly equal population. The seat was first contested in the 2005 election at which Labor member John Quigley, who had formerly represented the abolished inner-northern seat of Innaloo, was successful.

Mindarie was abolished by the 2011 redistribution, replaced by the electorate of Butler at the 2013 state election. The change was necessitated by the move of the namesake suburb into the neighbouring electorate of Ocean Reef.

Geography

Mindarie stretched from the coastal boundary of the City of Wanneroo to its northern and eastern limits, and comprised 547 km² of land otherwise bounded in the south by the Kinross east-west boundary fence, Burns Beach Road, Wanneroo Road, Flynn Drive, Old Yanchep Road and Neaves Road. Its boundaries include the outposts of Yanchep and Two Rocks, the populated suburbs of Butler, Jindalee, Clarkson, Merriwa, Mindarie, Quinns Rocks and Ridgewood, the semi-rural localities of Carabooda, Neerabup, Nowergup, and the unpopulated localities of Alkimos, Eglinton, Pinjar and Tamala Park.

The 2007 redistribution, which took effect at the 2008 election, radically changed the boundaries—the seat then only included the southern part of Quinns Rocks and all of Clarkson, Mindarie and Tamala Park of the region now included within it. The rest of the seat, within the City of Joondalup, included the suburbs of Burns Beach, Currambine, Iluka, Kinross, Ocean Reef and a small northwestern section of Mullaloo. Those regions are now in the new seat of Ocean Reef.

Members for Mindarie

Election results

References

External links
 
 

Former electoral districts of Western Australia